The International Water Association (IWA) is a nonprofit organization and knowledge hub for the water sector, connecting water professionals and companies to find solutions to the world's water challenges. The IWA is headquartered in London, UK, with a global secretariat based in Nanjing, China, and a regional office in Chennai, India.

IWA has a membership comprising technology companies, water and wastewater utilities, and wider stakeholders in the fields of water services, infrastructure engineering and consulting as well as more than 10,000 individuals including scientists and researchers. IWA works across a wide range of issues covering the full water cycle, with four programmes (Digital Water, Basins of the Future, Cities of the Future, Water and Sanitation Services) that work towards achieving the Sustainable Development Goals and addressing the threat to sustainable water supplies posed by climate change.

History
The IWA has its roots in the International Water Supply Association (IWSA), established in June 1947, and the International Association on Water Quality (IAWQ), which was originally formed as the International Association for Water Pollution Research (IAWPR) in 1962, formally constituted in June 1965, renamed International Association of Water Pollution Research and Control (IAWPRC) in March 1982 and adopting IAWQ in May 1992. The two groups with separate causes, cultures, and working methods merged on 7 September 1999 to form the IWA, creating one international organisation focused on the full water cycle.

In March 2015, AquaRating was announced as the world's first rating agency for the water sector by establishing the international standard for assessing water and sanitation services provision, jointly developed by the Inter-American Development Bank and the IWA. On 1 September 2016, the World Bank and IWA announced the establishment of a partnership surrounding the reduction of water losses.

Scope

The group's mission is to serve as a worldwide network for water professionals and to advance standards and best practices in sustainable water management. The association has four member types: individual, student, corporate, and governing members. There are about 10,000 individual and 500 corporate members, with governing members in approximately 80 countries.

IWA Publishing was established as the wholly owned subsidiary of the International Water Association (IWA) in 1999 to provide information services on all aspects of water, wastewater and related environmental fields. The publishing programme includes The Source (the IWA membership magazine) and a broad range of peer reviewed journals (e.g. Water Science and Technology, Hydrology Research and Water Research) alongside books, research reports, manuals of best practice, and online services.

IWA annually hosts more than 40 specialist conferences and workshops on various aspects of water management. Events organized by the IWA include the World Water Congress & Exhibition (WWCE) and the Water and Development Congress & Exhibition.

There are four programs at the IWA: 
Basins of the future(water security)
Cities of the future (urban metabolism, sustainable city)
Water and sanitation services(wastewater management)
Water policy and regulation

WWCE locations and dates

References

External links

 The International Water Association (IWA) website

Environmental management-related professional associations
Environmental organisations based in London
International organisations based in London
International water associations
Members of the International Council for Science
Organisations based in the City of Westminster